Richmond Plantation, also known as Girl Scout Plantation, is a national historic district located near Cordesville, Berkeley County, South Carolina. It was built about 1927, and includes a manor house and outbuildings constructed as a hunting lodge for George A. Ellis, a prominent New York financier and co-founder of E. F. Hutton & Co.

The manor house is a -story, asymmetrical brick building with a rectangular central mass, and two single story wings—an American interpretation of the Shavian Manor Style, defined by the neo-medieval work of the English architect Richard Norman Shaw. Also on the property are four outbuildings in the Shavian Manor Style: a carriage house, dog house, guest house, and gate house. Additional features of the property include a one-story log house, three one-story frame cabins, a cemetery, and archaeological remains of the original 18th and 19th century rice plantation. In 1963 the property was sold to the Low Country Girl Scout Council, who maintained it as a camp until 2011. The property was sold, via absolute auction, to a private buyer in 2013 but remains under the terms of a conservation easement.

It was listed in the National Register of Historic Places in 1980.

References

Girl Scouts of the USA
Agricultural buildings and structures on the National Register of Historic Places in South Carolina
Archaeological sites on the National Register of Historic Places in South Carolina
Historic districts on the National Register of Historic Places in South Carolina
Houses completed in 1927
Buildings and structures in Berkeley County, South Carolina
National Register of Historic Places in Berkeley County, South Carolina
Plantations in South Carolina
Plantation houses in South Carolina